Arignar Anna College, is a general degree college located in Aralvaymoli, Kanyakumari district, Tamil Nadu. It was established in the year 1970. The college is affiliated with Manonmaniam Sundaranar University. This college offers different courses in arts, commerce and science.

Departments

Science
Physics
Chemistry
Mathematics
Botany
Zoology
Computer Application

Arts and Commerce
Tamil
English
Economics
Commerce

Accreditation
The college is  recognized by the University Grants Commission (UGC).

See also
Education in India
Literacy in India
List of colleges in Kanyakumari district
List of institutions of higher education in Tamil Nadu

References

External links
http://www.arignarannacollege.com/

Educational institutions established in 1970
1970 establishments in Tamil Nadu
Colleges affiliated to Manonmaniam Sundaranar University
Universities and colleges in Kanyakumari district